Supertramp were an English progressive rock band from London. Formed in 1969, the group originally consisted of bassist and lead vocalist Roger Hodgson, guitarist and vocalist Richard Palmer, keyboardist and vocalist Rick Davies, and drummer Keith Baker. The band's current lineup includes Davies alongside drummer Bob Siebenberg, saxophonist John Helliwell (both since 1973), guitarist Carl Verheyen, trumpeter Lee Thornburg, bassist Cliff Hugo, keyboardist Mark Hart (all of whom joined in 1996), multi-instrumentalist Jesse Siebenberg (since 1997), keyboardist Gabe Dixon and backing vocalist Cassie Miller (both since 2010).

History

1969–1988
Supertramp were formed under the name of Daddy by Roger Hodgson, Richard Palmer, Rick Davies and Keith Baker. Baker was soon replaced by Robert Millar, who performed on the group's self-titled debut album. Shortly after the album's release in July 1970, Dave Winthrop joined on flute and saxophone, while both Palmer and Millar left. Palmer's role was taken over by Hodgson, with Frank Farrell joining on bass and Kevin Currie joining on drums. After the release of their second album Indelibly Stamped in June 1971, Supertramp began to fracture as they lost their funding and Farrell, Currie and Winthrop all left the band between 1972 and 1973.

Davies and Hodgson rebuilt Supertramp in 1973, bringing in new members Dougie Thomson on bass, Bob Siebenberg on drums and John Helliwell on saxophone and woodwind instruments, who together released the band's "breakthrough" album Crime of the Century in 1974. This lineup remained stable for a total of ten years, until Hodgson left in 1983 following a period of "musical differences" with the rest of the group, mainly Davies. The group continued as a four-piece with touring musicians following Hodgson's departure, releasing the less successful Brother Where You Bound in 1985 and Free as a Bird in 1987, before breaking up the following year.

1996 onwards
In 1996, Supertramp reformed with returning members Davies, Siebenberg and Helliwell, plus new members Mark Hart (keyboards, guitar, vocals), Carl Verheyen (guitar, backing vocals), Cliff Hugo (bass), Lee Thornburg (trumpet, trombone, backing vocals) and Tom Walsh (percussion). After the release of Some Things Never Change in 1997, Walsh was replaced by Jesse Siebenberg, son of drummer Bob. Slow Motion followed in 2002. Davies and Hodgson tried on several occasions to reunite in Supertramp, to no avail. In April 2010, Davies reformed Supertramp to commemorate the band's 40th anniversary, with Gabe Dixon replacing Mark Hart, and new member Cassie Miller joining on backing vocals. Hart returned in 2015, although a concert tour was cancelled due to Davies undergoing treatment for cancer.

Members

Touring

Session

Timeline

Lineups

References

External links
Supertramp official website

Supertramp
Supertramp members